Jiří Poukar (born April 19, 1969) is a Czech former professional ice hockey forward.

Poukar played in the Czechoslovak First Ice Hockey League and the Czech Extraliga for HC Dukla Jihlava, HC Slavia Praha and HC Znojemští Orli between 1989 and 2000. He won a league championship in 1991 with Dukla Jihlava.

Poukar also played six games for the Czech Republic men's national ice hockey team.

References

External links

1969 births
Living people
Czech ice hockey forwards
HC Dukla Jihlava players
EHC Freiburg players
Orli Znojmo players
HC Slavia Praha players
HC Slezan Opava players
HC Slovan Ústečtí Lvi players
HC Tábor players
Czech expatriate ice hockey players in Germany
Czechoslovak ice hockey forwards